Catwoman is a fictional character appearing in Batman #1. After her debut she would appear in many forms of media including live-action appearances in the Batman television series (1966–68), its film adaptation Batman (1966), Batman Returns (1992), Catwoman (2004), The Dark Knight Rises (2012), Gotham (2014–19), and The Batman (2022). The character has also appeared in numerous animated television series and movies, most notably Batman: The Animated Series (1992–95) and The Lego Batman Movie (2017), as well as video games such as the Batman: Arkham series.

She has been portrayed by Julie Newmar, Lee Meriwether, Eartha Kitt, Michelle Pfeiffer, Halle Berry, Anne Hathaway, Camren Bicondova, Lili Simmons and Zoë Kravitz, and has been voiced by Adrienne Barbeau, Grey DeLisle, Kravitz, Elizabeth Gillies, and numerous others.

Television

Live-action

Batman (1966–1968)

Catwoman in the 1966 live-action television series Batman is portrayed by Julie Newmar and Eartha Kitt. Newmar portrayed Catwoman in the first and second season, and Kitt portrayed her in the third season. The feature film credits Lee Meriwether as both Catwoman and Miss Kitka. All three Catwoman incarnations are described by comic writer, Marc Andreyko, in an afterword to a Batman '66 Meets Wonder Woman '77 omnibus, as being akin to a "Darrin-in-Bewitched bit of silent recasting" and his colleague, co-writer Jeff Parker, liked how their story "leaves no one out and the readers got it immediately", thus reflecting how the change of actress was never specifically addressed. In the TV series, Catwoman was given neither a background nor an alter ego, but focused instead on her costumed aspects. The costume created for the series was similar to the green catsuit appearing in the comics at the time, though it was constructed by Newmar from black Lurex fabric. One of these costumes tailored for Newmar is part of the collection of the Smithsonian Institution.

Due to other commitments, Newmar was unavailable for the tie-in film produced after the first season, and for the series' third season. An uncredited body double played the role in a cameo in "The Entrancing Dr. Cassandra", the series' penultimate episode.

Birds of Prey
The 2002 television series Birds of Prey included an adaptation of the Silver Age Huntress as one of its main characters. Catwoman was also adapted for the series as she is an integral component of the back story for Huntress. That adaptation was limited to the alter ego, a costume design similar to the one used in the 1992 film Batman Returns, and adding the aspect of the character being a "metahuman". Catwoman was portrayed by Casey Elizabeth Easlick. She was uncredited and her appearances were limited to a flashback of her death which was edited into the series title sequence and the rare in-episode flashback.

Gotham

Selina Kyle is featured in the TV series Gotham, with her younger version portrayed by Camren Bicondova, while the adult version of the character is portrayed by Lili Simmons. Selina Kyle is initially depicted as a 13-year-old thief and orphan who lives on the streets of Gotham City. In the series' pilot episode, she witnesses the murders of Thomas and Martha Wayne. She forms a tenuous alliance with GCPD Detective Jim Gordon after he saves her from kidnappers working for the Dollmaker. She promises to help him solve the Wayne murders if he helps her get out of trouble with the law. Gordon arranges for her to stay at Wayne Manor, where she befriends the young Bruce Wayne. She saves him from a gang of hired killers and gives him his first kiss. Throughout the rest of the series, Selina overcomes her insecurities and develops a love-hate relationship with Bruce while helping him keep order in Gotham City, despite often butting heads with him due to her moral ambiguity.

Bicondova was cast to portray the teenaged Selina, assuming she was auditioning for a random role named "Lucy" and not finding out what the real role was until after she was selected. While she takes inspiration from previous Catwoman actresses Michelle Pfeiffer, Anne Hathaway and others, Bicondova wanted to portray a side of Selina Kyle not seen before, focusing on her past. As the series finale jumps ten years into the future from the rest of the series, Bicondova did not feel comfortable portraying her character as an adult, and at her request, an older actress was chosen to portray the adult Selina Kyle. Warner Bros. Television cast Lili Simmons in the role, with Simmons and Bicondova collaborating closely on the adult Selina's characterization.

Titans
In the Titans episode "Lazarus", both her goggles and whip are shown in Batman's trophy room in the Batcave. In the season 3 finale episode "Purple Rain", Tim Drake tells Beast Boy put in the name (Selina Kyle) in the security question at Wayne Manor that asks "What's the name of one who got away?" following which Beast Boy / Gar asks Tim "Who's Selina Kyle?".

Batwoman
In the Batwoman episode "A Lesson from Professor Pyg", Ryan and Alice were tracking someone who's using Catwoman's bullwhip and mentioned that both Batman and Catwoman have a thing. It was later revealed that it's Flamingo who's doing all of the victims.

Animated

Super Friends
Catwoman was originally supposed to be featured in the Challenge of the Super Friends season of Super Friends as a member of the Legion of Doom. However, due Filmation's The New Adventures of Batman development at that time, Catwoman was restricted to appear in the show. She was eventually replaced with Cheetah.

Filmation Batman series
Catwoman was first adapted to television animation by Filmation, for the 1968 series The Batman/Superman Hour. The character design and aspects adapted were similar to those used in the previous live-action television series: a focus on the character in costume, lack of a backstory, and use of the then-current green catsuit. Like the live action TV series, Catwoman behaved like many of her villainous counterparts (Joker, Riddler), by speaking in puns and hiring henchmen who wore outfits similar to hers. Jane Webb was cast to provide the voice for the character.

Filmation returned to the character in 1977 for the animated series The New Adventures of Batman, where Melendy Britt was cast to voice the character in four episodes. Again, no backstory or alter ego were presented within the episodes. The yellow and orange costume design used was unique to the series.

DC animated universe

Catwoman was adapted for Batman: The Animated Series and The New Batman Adventures, set in the same continuity from the DC Animated Universe, voiced by Adrienne Barbeau. A spin-off focused on the character was in production before being cancelled; it was reconsidered years later as a dual spin-off also focused on Nightwing.

The character design for Batman: The Animated Series is a long-haired blonde look (based on Michelle Pfeiffer's appearance) when Selina is not wearing her costume, and the costume itself is a predominately gray catsuit based on the costume used in Batman Returns as well, with long black gloves and high-heeled boots. Along with a black portion of the mask, this gives the appearance of a seal-point Siamese cat.

When The New Batman Adventures went into development, Catwoman's redesign resulted in an all-black catsuit, blue-white face make-up and short black hair. The first series establishes Catwoman as a socialite and animal rights activist in addition to a costumed thief in the early appearances. Beyond this, no backstory or actual origin is provided within the series. The series does play somewhat on the relation between Batman and Catwoman. She had a crush on Batman, but tried to keep her distance between her and Bruce Wayne, even though they dated.

Catwoman also appears in the short featurette "Chase Me".

In Batman Beyond, Catwoman does not appear as her ultimate fate after her last appearance in "Chase Me" remains completely unknown. However, she was mentioned by Bruce at the end of the episode "Dead Man's Hand". After the release of Batman Beyond: Return of the Joker, a second movie with an elderly Catwoman as a main character was planned by Bruce Timm, but was finally scrapped. However, in Justice League Unlimiteds episode "Epilogue", it was revealed that Selina eventually reformed and became an ally of Batman, though she eventually left him prior to his retirement from crime-fighting much like his other partners.

The Batman

Catwoman appears in the 2004 animated series The Batman, voiced by Gina Gershon. The character design used was based loosely on the then-current costume used in the comic books. This resulted in a black/dark grey catsuit with a pull-up collar mask, dark red, claw-tipped gloves, a black cowl with exaggerated cat ears, and large amber goggles. She also has blue eyes instead of green. The initial episode featuring Catwoman establishes her as working as a charity fund raiser in her identity of Selina Kyle. With the majority of her remaining appearances focusing on her activities only as Catwoman, an origin for the character is never provided.

Batman Black and White
Catwoman appears in the Batman Black and White motion comics, voiced by Janyse Jaud.

Batman: The Brave and the Bold
Catwoman appears in the 2008 animated series Batman: The Brave and the Bold, voiced by Nika Futterman. Keeping with the tone of the show, the character design used for most of her appearances was drawn from the 1950s through mid-1960s and again from the late 1970 to the mid-1980s. This outfit is the purple long sleeved dress with green cloak and purple headdress/mask with cat-ears.

DC Nation
Catwoman appeared in the Batman of Shanghai shorts on the DC Nation block, voiced by Stephanie Sheh. In a departure from the comics, she was portrayed as a Chinese thief active in Shanghai during the 1930s.

DC Super Hero Girls
Catwoman appears in the web series DC Super Hero Girls as a student at Super Hero High, voiced by Cristina Pucelli.

DC Super Hero Girls
Catwoman appears in the 2019 animated series DC Super Hero Girls, voiced by Cree Summer.

Harley Quinn

Catwoman appears in the DC Universe animated series Harley Quinn, voiced by Sanaa Lathan. This incarnation of Catwoman is of African American descent and is said to be the "best burglar in all of Gotham." Introduced in the season two episode, "Trapped", she is recruited by the titular character and Poison Ivy to help them steal Firefly's flamethrower from Doctor Trap's booby-trapped museum. Though she effortlessly makes it through said museum and robs several treasures, Catwoman betrays them and leaves them to die. Despite this, she and Ivy appear to remain on good terms, as Catwoman later attended her bachelorette party in the episode "Bachelorette". In the season two finale, "The Runaway Bridesmaid", Catwoman attends Ivy's wedding as a bridesmaid and with Tim Burton as her date. Catwoman returns in the show's third season, as Harley and her crew move into her penthouse apartment after the abandoned mall they had been living in is destroyed while she lives in the mansion of her new boyfriend, revealed to be Bruce Wayne. However, she ends up breaking up with him due to unresolved issues stemming from his parents murder. It is also revealed that she and Ivy had once hooked up, but the relationship ended when Ivy realized Catwoman didn't take the prospect of them being together seriously.

Batwheels 
Catwoman appears in the 2022 animated series Batwheels, voiced by Gina Rodriguez.

Film

Live action

Batman (1966)

The first feature film to include an adaptation of Catwoman was Batman, produced immediately after production of the first season of the 1966 television series of the same name. When the producers realized that Julie Newmar would be unavailable due to prior commitments, they cast Lee Meriwether to portray the character.

Return to the Batcave: The Misadventures of Adam and Burt, a television film which aired in 2003, was a semi-documentary of the production of the 1966 television series and film. It featured dramatizations one of which included Julia Rose portraying a young Julie Newmar on set in character as Catwoman. Newmar and Meriwether also appeared in the film.

Batman Returns (1992)

Catwoman is portrayed by Michelle Pfeiffer in the 1992 feature film Batman Returns. Re-created by Daniel Waters, the character is based on the Selina Kyle from "Catwoman: Her Sister's Keeper". Annette Bening was originally cast in the role but dropped out due to pregnancy. Other actresses including Nicole Kidman, Madonna, Jennifer Beals, Lorraine Bracco and Demi Moore were all linked to the role, and actress Sean Young campaigned heavily to get it (even turning up to Warner Bros. Studios in a homemade Catwoman suit). When it was suggested to Tim Burton that Michelle Pfeiffer was interested, something clicked to the producers thinking "She's perfect. She also could be both Selina Kyle and Catwoman."

This version of Selina Kyle is depicted as a mousy, lonely and frustrated secretary of corrupt tycoon Max Shreck. After Selina accidentally discovers Shreck's plot to build a power plant that would steal Gotham's electricity, Shreck attempts to murder her by pushing her out the window of his top-story office. She survives the fall and is mysteriously revived by a group of alley cats that flock around her and begin gnawing at her fingers. When she returns home, she suffers a psychotic breakdown and becomes the more seductive and deadly Catwoman. As part of her larger plan to destroy Shreck, she allies herself with the Penguin, which attracts Batman's attention. Meanwhile, she begins a relationship with Bruce Wayne, at first not knowing that he is Batman. It's when she unknowingly helps Penguin frame Batman for a murder that her conscience resurfaces, with her quest for revenge gradually destroying her. At the climax of the film, Catwoman tries to kill Shreck. Although Shreck shoots her several times, he fails to kill her. She then kills Shreck by kissing him with a taser in her mouth while holding onto an exposed power cable. An explosion ensues, but afterwards, Batman finds only Shreck's charred corpse; Catwoman is not present. As the Bat-signal later shines in the night sky, a figure wearing Catwoman's outfit watches it from afar, suggesting that she has survived.

The film's interpretation of Catwoman derives heavily from the Pre-Crisis version of the character.

Prior to the announcement Michael Keaton will be reprising his role as Batman in the upcoming The Flash set in the DC Extended Universe, Pfeiffer previously stated a willingness and enthusiasm to reprise her own role as Catwoman. In a 2021 interview with Screen Rant, Pfeiffer stated that she would be interested in reprising the role in The Flash, but that "no one's asked me yet".

Batman Forever (1995)
While Catwoman did not return in Batman Forever, she was referenced by Dr. Chase Meridian when she tells Batman: "You like strong women. I've done my homework. Or do I need skin-tight vinyl and a whip?".

Aborted spin-off
Burton had no interest in returning to direct a sequel of Batman Returns, but was credited as producer. With Warner Bros. moving on development for Batman Forever in June 1993, a Catwoman spin-off was announced. Michelle Pfeiffer was to reprise her role, with the character not to appear in Forever because of her own spin-off.

Burton became attached as director, while producer Denise Di Novi and writer Daniel Waters also returned. In January 1994, Burton was unsure of his plans to direct Catwoman or an adaptation of "The Fall of the House of Usher". On June 16, 1995, Waters turned in his Catwoman script to Warner Bros., the same day that Batman Forever was released. Burton was still being courted to direct. Waters joked, "Turning it in the day Batman Forever opened may not have been my best logistical move, in that it's the celebration of the fun-for-the-whole-family Batman. Catwoman is definitely not a fun-for-the-whole-family script." In an August 1995 interview, Pfeiffer re-iterated her interest in the spin-off, but explained her priorities would be challenged as a mother and commitments to other projects. The film labored in development hell for years, with Pfeiffer replaced by Ashley Judd. The film ended up becoming the critically panned Catwoman (2004), starring Halle Berry.

Aborted Batman reboot
In 2000, Warner Bros. commissioned Darren Aronofsky for an adaptation of Batman: Year One to reboot the Batman franchise. The script featured an African-American Selina Kyle/Catwoman in a prominent role.

Catwoman (2004)

In 2004, the feature film Catwoman was released. Starring Halle Berry, this film's Catwoman bears little resemblance to the comic book version. Berry portrays Patience Phillips, an artist and graphics designer who works for a cosmetics company called Hedare Beauty, which is ready to ship a new skin cream called Beau-Line that is able to reverse the effects of aging. However, as Patience visits the factory where it is being manufactured, she learns that the product has deadly side-effects. Laurel Hedare (Sharon Stone), the wife of the company's CEO, orders her killed. Hedare's minions drown her, but she is mysteriously brought back to life by Midnight, an Egyptian Mau cat, and from that point on develops cat-like abilities. A researcher named Ophelia Powers (Frances Conroy) tells Patience that Egyptian Mau cats serve as messengers of the goddess Bast, suggesting that Patience has been granted supernatural powers. Wearing a mask to disguise her identity, Patience stalks the night as Catwoman seeking revenge against her murderers. Eventually, her search leads her to Hedare, who murders her husband and frames her for it. In the film's climactic fight scene between Hedare and Catwoman, Hedare falls to her death. Patience is cleared of murder charges, and decides to become Catwoman permanently.

The movie alludes to other women who have been granted such cat-like abilities, particularly in a scene in which Patience is introduced to a series of photos of prior Catwomen, including Pfeiffer's Batman Returns version of Selina Kyle.

The film's story has nothing to do with the Batman universe, and is considered "Catwoman in name only". It was poorly received by critics and audiences, and is commonly listed as one of the worst films ever made.

The Dark Knight Rises (2012)

Selina Kyle is portrayed by Anne Hathaway in The Dark Knight Rises. Entertainment Weekly describes this version as an enigma, a wily and witty con artist, as well as a high society grifter. She is depicted as a femme fatale antiheroine whose actions often blur ethical lines, similar to her portrayal in the comics. Certain actresses considered for the role of Selina Kyle included Natalie Portman, Keira Knightley, Kate Mara, Gemma Arterton, Blake Lively and music superstar Lady Gaga.

In the film, Selina Kyle is hired by corrupt businessman John Daggett to steal Bruce Wayne's fingerprints; Daggett in exchange promises to expunge her criminal record with a "Clean Slate" computer program, during which she meets and falls in love with Bruce. Bane subsequently uses Bruce's prints to attack Gotham City's stock exchange and bankrupt Bruce with bogus stock trades. She also steals the pearl necklace belonging to Bruce's deceased mother and takes a congressman hostage. After Daggett betrays her, Selina leads Batman to Bane's trap without realizing that Batman and Bruce are the same person. She attempts to flee Gotham, fearing that Bane's terrorist group will eventually kill her. John Blake arrests her for kidnapping and takes her to Blackgate Prison to await trial. She is subsequently "released" when Bane takes control of Gotham. When Batman returns to Gotham and offers her the "Clean Slate", she aids the Dark Knight in liberating Gotham City from Bane's chaos. With Selina's help, Batman rescues Lucius Fox. Using the Batpod, Selina destroys the blockade at the tunnel leading out of Gotham. During the battle, Selina kills Bane with the Batpod's grenade launcher and helps Batman destroy Talia al Ghul's convoy. At the end of the movie, Bruce leaves the Batman mantle behind and enters a relationship with Selina. She is never referred to as "Catwoman" in the film, although she does receive the moniker in related The Dark Knight Rises merchandise. Instead, emphasis is made upon her profession as a "cat" burglar in headlines shown in the film; also, her safecracking goggles resemble cat ears when not in use.

The Batman (2022)

Catwoman is portrayed by Zoë Kravitz in the 2022 film The Batman. Kravitz had previously voiced the role in The Lego Batman Movie. Zazie Beetz, Alicia Vikander, Ana de Armas, Ella Balinska and Eiza González also auditioned for the role. Here, Selina Kyle is the biological daughter of Carmine Falcone, born from an affair he had with her mother Maria, and works for him as a waitress at the Iceberg Lounge alongside her roommate Annika Koslov while moonlighting as a cat burglar. When she learns that Falcone murdered Annika due to her learning that he ratted out Sal Maroni to get him arrested, she attempts to kill him, but is stopped by Batman. She later helps Batman stop Riddler's plan to kill Gotham's newly-elected mayor. Afterwards, she decides to leave Gotham, and warns Batman that Gotham will never change and his efforts to help it are futile before bidding him goodbye. She is never referred to as "Catwoman" in the film, but she calls herself the "Cat" in one scene and wears a mask with points like cat ears.

Gotham City Sirens (TBA)
Catwoman is set to appear in Gotham City Sirens with Harley Quinn and Poison Ivy, but the film's production has stopped for the moment.

Animated
 In Justice League: Crisis on Two Earths, a amalgation of Man-Bat and Catwoman named She-Bat appeared on a computer page of the lesser members of the Crime Syndicate.
 Eliza Dushku voices Catwoman in Batman: Year One. The DVD and Blu-ray release also features the short film DC Showcase: Catwoman, again with Eliza Dushku providing the voice.
 Catwoman appears in Lego Batman: The Movie - DC Superheroes Unite, adapted from Lego Batman 2: DC Superheroes video game, voiced by Katherine Von Till.
 Selina Kyle appears in Batman: The Dark Knight Returns, voiced by Tress MacNeille.
 Julie Newmar reprised her role as Catwoman in Batman: Return of the Caped Crusaders, which is a continuation of the 1960s television series. The movie includes a brief reference to the Lee Meriwether and Eartha Kitt versions of the character when a hit on the head causes Batman to see a triple image of Catwoman. Newmar reprises the role in Batman vs. Two-Face. Meriwether also makes an appearance as Lucille Diamond, King Tut's lawyer. Catwoman escapes prison by switching outfits with Lucille and trapping the lawyer in her cell. Diamond, upon awakening, finds she enjoys the costume and even begins purring, implying the Meriwether incarnation was a different individual.
 Catwoman appears in The Lego Batman Movie, voiced by Zoë Kravitz. She is a member of The Rogues, the team of supervillains in league with the Joker.
 The Brave and the Bold version of Catwoman appears in Scooby-Doo! & Batman: The Brave and the Bold, with Nika Futterman reprising her role.
 Selina Kyle appears in the animated Gotham by Gaslight adaptation, voiced by Jennifer Carpenter, with Grey Griffin as her singing voice.
 Catwoman appears in the anime film Batman Ninja, voiced by Ai Kakuma and Grey Griffin in Japanese and English respectively.
 Catwoman appears in the animated film Batman: Hush, voiced by Jennifer Morrison.
 Catwoman appears in the two-part animated film Batman: The Long Halloween voiced posthumously by Naya Rivera.
 Catwoman appears in the animated film Injustice, voiced by Anika Noni Rose.
 An anime Catwoman film titled Catwoman: Hunted with Elizabeth Gillies voicing the character was released on February 8, 2022.

Video games

Lego
 Catwoman appears in Lego Batman: The Video Game, voiced by Vanessa Marshall. She appears as an enemy of Batman, a 1st deputy of the Penguin, and the first boss of Chapter 2 "Power-Crazed Penguin." Her abilities are double-jump, whip attacks, and making guards open love gates (not a mind-control ability). She is the only one of the Penguin's followers (excluding the Penguin himself) that does not have superhuman strength. The Penguin assigns her to steal the Gotham Diamond from the museum in order to power up his machine that controls his penguin bombs. She awes the police by leaping back and forth and she manages to slip away with it. Batman and Robin see her, chase her, and catch up to her, and they can inflict damage on her simply by attacking her, but if there are some of the Penguin's henchmen around, she will leap away. After she is defeated, She and Batman kiss much to Robin's disgust, but she tosses the Gotham Diamond off the building and a cat (possibly hers) takes it. She then struggles against some policemen and hides from them, but Batman lays a bowl of milk to get her attention and throws her in the police van while she is drinking and it drives off. In a prison cell, the same cat brings her the Gotham Diamond. The Penguin saw her get captured and he teams up with Killer Croc to rescue her when he hears she has the diamond. After she is rescued, she gives the diamond to the Penguin, and they go to Gotham Zoo to set up the machine. They power it up and activate the penguins, but Batman and Robin arrive to stop it. She fights alongside the Penguin as a miniboss; although she cannot be damaged, she can still attack the player. When the Penguin is defeated, she tries to sneak away, but Batman just throws a batarang at her. In the ending, she is seen in Arkham Asylum grooming herself. She is one of three bosses that later appears as a miniboss, the other two being Two-Face & Harley Quinn.
 Catwoman appears in Lego Batman 2: DC Super Heroes, voiced by Katherine Von Till. She is among the inmates freed when Lex Luthor frees Joker from Arkham Asylum. In the level "Arkham Asylum Antics", she rides her motorcycle around the maze. Outside of the main story, she appears as an optional boss at the police station. She has no dialogue other than laughter.
 Catwoman appears as a playable character in Lego Batman 3: Beyond Gotham, voiced by Laura Bailey. In the game, the primary version's default design is her New 52 costume with the 1966 and Pre-New 52 designs as alternates. She appears in a side quest in the Watchtower where the player has to help her find a cat statue and she later appears on Ysmault where the player has to help Dex-Starr find a new hangout spot. In one of Kevin Smith's side-quests, she steals the film that Smith made and the player has to find where it is; on the middle of the quest, she comes across the player and reveals she hid the film because it was bad and states she "knows a thing or two about really bad movies", a possible reference to the poorly reviewed Catwoman movie. The 1966 version appears as a miniboss in the bonus level "Same Bat-Time, Same Bat-Channel" based on the 1960s TV show.  Also, The Dark Knight Rises version of Selina Kyle is a separate playable character via DLC.
 The Lego Batman Movie version of Catwoman makes a cameo in Lego Dimensions, voiced again by Grey Griffin. The player has to rescue her in a sidequest.
 Catwoman appears as one of the main characters in Lego DC Super-Villains, voiced by Grey Griffin. She plays a role in the story as one of the main characters. She and other villains go on their normal criminal activities during the Justice League's absence until they get to deal with the presence of the "Justice Syndicate". She is one of the first to notice that the Syndicate members are not what they claim to be when she sees how different Owlman is compared to Batman.

Batman: Arkham

Catwoman is a recurring character in the Batman: Arkham games, voiced by Grey DeLisle. She is playable in most of her appearances, and has her own range of animations and abilities, including gadgets such as her bullwhip and caltrops.

 While Catwoman does not physically appear in Batman: Arkham Asylum, parts of her costume are found on display inside the Arkham Mansion and scanning them to solve one of the Riddler's riddles will unlock her bio. She is also referenced by the Joker addressing a crate of Titan to the character as a gift, and appears on a list of Arkham inmates liberated by Harley Quinn.
 Catwoman makes her debut in the series in Batman: Arkham City. In addition to making a few non-playable appearances throughout the main story, she is featured as part of her own story DLC, and is also playable in the game's challenge mode; the Catwoman DLC missions are included in all subsequent re-releases of the game. Catwoman first appears in the prologue of the game, breaking into a safe belonging to Two-Face, in order to retrieve the blueprints of Hugo Strange's confiscated goods vault, where Arkham City's warden is holding Catwoman's loot. However, she is captured by Two-Face in the act, and taken to his courthouse. Dangling above a vat of acid, Catwoman is given a mock-trial by Two-Face, who plans to execute her to secure his gang's loyalty through fear. After saving Catwoman and subduing Two-Face, Batman questions her about Arkham City's true nature, but she denies having any knowledge about it and leaves to continue her quest. In order to break into Strange's vault, she enlists the help of Poison Ivy, who reluctantly agrees. After retrieving her loot from the vault, Catwoman witnesses Strange's genocidal Protocol 10 being enacted, and reluctantly abandons her loot to rescue Batman, who was pinned under fallen rubble and left for dead. Later, Catwoman attempts to retrieve her belongings from her apartment and flee Arkham City, only to find a bomb planted by Two-Face. Surviving the explosion, she seeks out Two-Face once again, slashing him across the face and leaving to collect her belongings. However, after successfully retrieving her belongings, she chooses to stay in Arkham City for the time being, deciding she enjoys it too much to leave yet.
 Catwoman's first encounter with Batman is depicted in the prequel game Batman: Arkham Origins Blackgate. After stealing confidential data from a governmental building in Gotham City on behalf of her mysterious employer, Catwoman is pursued by both Batman and several DEO agents, the former of whom defeats her and leaves her for the police. Two weeks later, when a mysterious explosion at the Blackgate Penitentiary sets the inmates free, Catwoman offers to assist Batman in apprehending the Joker, Penguin, and Black Mask in exchange for a reduced prison sentence. However, as Batman defeats each of the villains, Catwoman's true intentions are slowly revealed. After Batman gains access to the prison's Arkham Wing, Catwoman betrays him and explains that she only used him to get to Bane, who she was hired to extract from Blackgate. Despite creating a distraction to slow down Batman and allow her to escape with Bane, Catwoman is ultimately defeated by the Dark Knight, and subsequently taken into custody along with Bane by Captain Rick Flag. In the game's post-credits scene, Flag and Amanda Waller are revealed to be Catwoman's employers.
 Catwoman returns as a playable character in Batman: Arkham Knight. During the main story, the Riddler contacts Batman and informs him that he has Catwoman hostage, and that in order to free her, Batman must complete a series of trials. For each trial he completes, Catwoman is rewarded with a key that defuses one of the bombs strapped around her neck. Batman and Catwoman eventually obtain all nine keys, and Catwoman is free to leave the orphanage where she was held hostage. However, she returns when Batman comes back to confront the Riddler, and the two defeat him. After the fight, Batman finally admits his feelings for Catwoman as he allows her to kiss him, before telling her this is the last time they will see each other. Later that night, he is unmasked and seemingly kills himself to protect his loved ones.
 Catwoman is also playable in the DLC expansion mission Catwoman's Revenge, set after the events of Arkham Knight. While the Riddler is in prison, Catwoman infiltrates one of his hideouts and exacts her revenge on him by destroying his underground robot factory and stealing all of his money. Catwoman was later added as a playable character to all of the game's challenge maps via an update.
 In Batman: Arkham VR, postcards from Selina Kyle which correspond with newspaper clippings of various jewelry heists can be found at the beginning of the game.
 Catwoman appears in the mobile game Batman: Arkham Underworld, acting as an information officer who keeps the player updated on the activities of Gotham City, as well as teaching new mechanics to the player and occasionally giving them missions in the form of favors for her services.

Injustice
 Catwoman appears as a playable fighter in Injustice: Gods Among Us, with Grey DeLisle reprising her role from Batman: Arkham City. This version was formerly a part of Batman's Insurgency, but switched over to Superman's Regime prior to the game's story in order to protect Batman. In Catwoman's ending, Catwoman resolves to fight crime in the newly-rebuilt Gotham City until she can reconcile with Batman. In the game, Catwoman has various alternate outfits such as mainstream and alternate as well as the design from Batman: Arkham City.
 Catwoman returns as a playable character in Injustice 2, voiced again by Grey DeLisle. In the story she appears as a member of Grodd's Society, but is revealed to be a double agent working for Batman. She teams up with Cyborg and Harley Quinn to bring Brother Eye out of Brainiac's control. In her single player ending, she gets together with Bruce after defeating Brainiac, but leaves him after quickly getting bored of the lifestyle. She steals a Mother Box to travel the galaxy stealing as much as her heart desires. This is the first media outside of the comics to reference Selina's sister, Maggie, as Atrocitus is interested in how she affects Selina's rage.

Batman: The Telltale Series
Catwoman appears in Telltale Games' Batman series, voiced by Laura Bailey. Like the modern interpretations of the character, she serves as an anti-hero and occasional ally of Batman.
 Catwoman makes her debut in the first season. She first confronts Batman as she tries to steal a data drive from Mayor Hamilton Hill's office, which she loses during the scuffle. As Selina Kyle, she is introduced to Bruce Wayne by Harvey Dent (whom she is dating) and deduces that he is the vigilante upon noticing an injury she gave him. After being unsuccessful to convince him to give her back the drive, she reluctantly gives him the address where she was to meet her employer. Catwoman also helps Batman stop a Children of Arkham attack on the Mayoral Debate, after he helps defeat an attempt on her life. Though Selina works the group in the hopes of clearing her debt, she later leaves them after being used as a hostage to lure Batman out. After he is critically wounded in a fight with Lady Arkham, she takes him to her apartment to recover and, if the player chooses to, sleeps with him. After Harvey destroys her apartment after finding Bruce there, she either leaves Gotham or stays briefly at Wayne Manor, though leaves after Bruce's incarceration in Arkham Asylum. After both Penguin and Harvey are defeated by Batman, Selina steals a prototype from Wayne Enterprises' R&D department. When caught trying to escape by Bruce, she admits to have only gotten close to him for another job. After returning the device, Selina leaves Gotham to distance herself from the conflict. Depending the player's actions, she will either stay in contact with Bruce, sending a cat themed postcard to him during the epilogue, or cut him off completely. 
 Catwoman returns in the second season, titled Batman: The Enemy Within. Prior to her return, Selina's postcard and broken goggles appear in the Batcave as part of her display. After the Pact retrieves Riddler's body from the Agency, it is revealed that she had been hired by them to assist in their heists. Catwoman is also mentioned to have been an associate of the Riddler, having been convinced to join them by the criminal. Though she works with the Pact to help uncover the location of an Agency black-site, she secretly tries to sabotage their plans in retribution for their supposed involvement in Riddler's death. Eventually, Selina decides to work with Bruce to stop them, during which she can be invited into the Batcave and enter a relationship with him. During the climax of the third episode, Bruce is forced to give either himself or her up as a traitor. If the former is chosen, she can help Batman defeat the Pact and flees the scene as the Agency arrives. However, regardless of what is chosen, she is captured by the Agency and made part of their supervillain program. Depending on whether the Joker becomes a vigilante or criminal, she either takes part in the fight between Batman, Joker and the Agency, or is used within Joker's attempts to get revenge on Batman. Depending on the choices made, Catwoman can either be released by the Agency, put under surveillance or keep working for the organization.

Other games
 Catwoman appears as a boss in the 1993 Batman Returns game based on Tim Burton's 1992 film.
 Catwoman appears as a boss in the 1993 Game Boy video game Batman: The Animated Series, where she teams up with Poison Ivy to kidnap Harvey Dent.
 Released on several platforms with very different gameplays, Catwoman only appears on the Super NES version of The Adventures of Batman & Robin video game, where she is chased around the rooftops of Gotham City by Batman. 
 In the 1999 side-scroller Catwoman video game by Kemco for Game Boy Color, Catwoman is hired by Talia al Ghul to steal an ancient crystal skull from the Gotham City Museum. Ra's al Ghul wants to use the skull to create a powerful weapon that will be capable of destroying an entire city.
 The Patience Phillips version of Catwoman appears in the Catwoman video game (a tie-in to 2004's Catwoman feature film), voiced by Jennifer Hale.
 Catwoman appears as a fighter in the crossover fighting game Mortal Kombat vs. DC Universe, played by Brenda Barrie and voiced by P. J. Mattson. This version is classified as a villain in the game. Her role in the game is small. Her game ending features her returning to Gotham City and discovering that due to the magical essence of the worlds merging, she now has the ability to transform into a black panther at will, enhancing her speed and strength. This incarnation is also referenced in pre-battle dialogue between Sub-Zero and Catwoman in Injustice 2 in which the two recognize one another from their previous encounter. 
In Mortal Kombat 11 she was used as a DLC skin for Kitana in the DC Elseworld Pack.
 Catwoman appears in Batman: The Brave and the Bold – The Videogame, voiced again by Nika Futterman. In the game, she teams up with Catman to steal an ancient artifact and turn all of the police into cats, in order to terrorize the city easier. 
 Catwoman appears in DC Universe Online, voiced by Kelley Huston. She is classified as a villain and is seen as a member of the Secret Society of Super Villains, although her main plot is considered heroic.
 Catwoman appears as a playable character in Infinite Crisis, voiced again by Grey DeLisle.
 Catwoman appears in the mobile game DC Legends.
 Catwoman appears as a playable character in SINoALICE, voiced again by Ai Kakuma.

Radio
 Catwoman, voiced by Lorelei King, appeared in the Batman radio drama The Lazarus Syndrome (1989).
 Catwoman, voiced by Rosario Dawson, appears in the Batman radio drama podcast, Batman: The Audio Adventures.

Fine arts 
Starting with the Pop Art period and on a continuing basis, since the 1960s the character of Catwoman has been "appropriated" by multiple visual artists and incorporated into contemporary artwork, most notably by Andy Warhol, Roy Lichtenstein, Mel Ramos, Dulce Pinzon, F. Lennox Campello, and others.

Actresses

References